2017 Thai League 3 Upper Region is the 1st season of the Thai football league. It is a part of the Thai League 3 and the feeder league for the Thai League 2. A total of 14 teams will compete in the league this season, after Prachinburi United failed in getting a licence for the league and Phichit withdrew before the season started.

Changes from last season

Team changes

Promoted clubs

Four club was promoted from the 2016 Thai Division 2 League Northern Region
 Kamphaeng Phet
 Phrae United
 Phayao
 Lamphun Warrior

Five club was promoted from the 2016 Thai Division 2 League North Eastern Region
 Udon Thani
 Ubon Ratchathani
 Kalasin
 Khon Kaen
 Amnat Poly United

Four club was promoted from the 2016 Thai Division 2 League Central Region
 Ayutthaya Warrior
 Ayutthaya
 Singburi Bang Rachan
 Ayutthaya United

Three club was promoted from the 2016 Thai Division 2 League Central Region
 Cha Choeng Sao
 Prachinburi United
 Sa Kaeo

Renamed clubs

 Phichit authorize from Ayutthaya Warrior because Phichit is an absolute football club quota.

Withdrawn clubs
 Phichit is taking a 1-year break. This team is automatically banned 2 years, don't get subsidy and relegated to 2019 Thai League 4 Northern Region.

Expansion clubs

 Prachinburi United Club-licensing football club didn't pass to play 2017 Thai League 3 Upper Region. This team is relegated to 2017 Thai League 4 Eastern Region again.

Teams

Stadium and locations

Sponsoring

Foreign players

The number of foreign players is restricted to five per T3 team. A team can use five foreign players on the field in each game, including at least one player from the AFC member countries and one player from nine countries member of ASEAN (3+1+1).
Note :: players who released during summer transfer window;: players who registered during summer transfer window.

League table

Standings

Positions by round

Results by match played

Results

Season statistics

Top scorers
As of 16 September 2017.

Hat-tricks

Attendances

Overall statistical table

Attendances by home match played

Source: Thai League 3
Note: Some error of T3 official match report 19 February 2017 (Lamphun Warrior 2–0 Ubon Ratchathani).
 Some error of T3 official match report 30 April 2017 (Kamphaengphet 3–1 Singburi Bangrajun).
 Some error of T3 official match report 2 July 2017 (Chachoengsao 5–0 Kamphaengphet).
 Some error of T3 official match report 12 August 2017 (Ayutthaya 1–0 Lamphun Warrior).

See also
 2017 Thai League
 2017 Thai League 2
 2017 Thai League 3
 2017 Thai League 4
 2017 Thai FA Cup
 2017 Thai League Cup
 2017 Thai League 3 Lower Region

References

 Thai League 3 Official Website
 Club licensing document passed

External links
Clubs data from Thai League 3 official website

Amnat United
Ayutthaya
Ayutthaya United
Chachoengsao
Kalasin
Kamphaengphet
Khonkaen
Lamphun Warrior
Phayao
Phrae United
Sakaeo
Singburi Bangrajun
Ubon Ratchathani
Udon Thani

Thai League 3
2017 in Thai football leagues